"All Fired Up" is a song written by Kerryn Tolhurst and first performed and released by Australian country rock group Rattling Sabres in 1987. It charted nationally, peaking at number 94 on the Australian Music Report. The following year, American singer-songwriter Pat Benatar recorded a version that became a chart hit in several countries, including Australia, where it reached number two on the ARIA Singles Chart.

Track listing
7-inch single
A. "All Fired Up"
B. "Nothin' Sacred"

Charts

Pat Benatar version

In 1988, Pat Benatar included a cover version on her seventh studio album, Wide Awake in Dreamland, and released it as the album's lead single in 1988. It reached number 19 on the US Billboard Hot 100—becoming Benatar's last US top 40 single as of —and peaked at the same position on both the UK Singles Chart and the Canadian RPM Top Singles chart. It also reached number 12 in South Africa and number two in Australia. The song is the title track on All Fired Up: The Very Best of Pat Benatar, a two-CD compilation released in 1994. In 1989, the song was nominated for Best Rock Vocal Performance, Female at the 31st Annual Grammy Awards.

Track listings
7-inch, cassette, and mini-CD single
 "All Fired Up" (single version) – 4:08
 "Cool Zero" – 5:26

12-inch and CD single
 "All Fired Up" – 4:08
 "Cool Zero" – 5:26
 "All Fired Up" (US edit) – 3:55

Charts

Weekly charts

Year-end charts

References

1987 songs
1988 singles
Chrysalis Records singles
Pat Benatar songs
Songs written by Kerryn Tolhurst